The third season of Drag Race España is scheduled to premiere on 16 April 2023. The season is set to air on ATRESplayer Premium in Spain and WOW Presents Plus internationally. The season was confirmed by Atresmedia on 20 September 2022,  along with an All Stars version of the franchise.

Production

Promotion 
The production company, World of Wonder, released a 15-second teaser on social media. The clip showcases the host, Supremme de Luxe, traveling throughout the galaxy with the season three contestants (without showing their faces).

The twelve contestants were announced on 19 March 2023. Contestants in the season included The Switch Drag Race alumni Pakita and Clover Bish, who became the franchise's second cisgender female contestant, following Victoria Scone from the British adaptation.

Contestants 

Ages, names, and cities stated are at time of filming.

Notes:

Contestants progress

References 

2023 in LGBT history
2023 Spanish television seasons
Drag Race España seasons